Garrison Sergeant Major William Daran Gillduff Mott,  is a former British Army soldier who was one of the army's most senior warrant officers between 2002 and 2015.

British service 
Mott was brought up in Overpool, Cheshire, before enlisting into the 1st Battalion, Welsh Guards in April 1979. He saw operational tours in Northern Ireland and during the Falklands War in 1982. He served at the Royal Military Academy Sandhurst as a colour sergeant, company sergeant major, and regimental sergeant major, before becoming Garrison Sergeant Major (GSM) at HQ Northern Ireland. He became GSM HQ London District in late 2002 and oversaw his first Trooping the Colour parade as GSM in June 2003. He was subsequently in charge of organising, choreographing and overseeing all major state ceremonial occasions. From 2003 he was also a pivotal figure in organising the repatriation ceremonies for British soldiers killed in action during operations in the Iraq War and the War in Afghanistan.

In February 2014, Mott publicly warned that cuts to the British defence budget were threatening to undermine the future spectacle of state ceremonial events in the United Kingdom.

He retired from the army in June 2015 following Trooping the Colour, during which the Welsh Guards marked the centennial year of their foundation.

Valley Forge 
Following retirement, he relocated to the America in 2015 to join his American wife in Kentucky. He was then invited the Valley Forge Military Academy in Wayne, Pennsylvania, where he quickly moved up in the hierarchy to be appointed as VFMAC's Garrison Sergeant Major. As of March 2022, Mott is employed by Valley Forge Military Academy in the United States and is the acting Commandant of Cadets, alongside working with the department of admissions and directing ceremonial drill.

Awards and honours 
Mott was awarded the Meritorious Service Medal in 2005. He was appointed Officer of the Order of the British Empire (OBE) in the 2007 Birthday Honours. In the 2012 Diamond Jubilee Honours he was appointed Member of the Royal Victorian Order (MVO) for his personal service to the monarch during the Diamond Jubilee of Elizabeth II. Mott was granted Freedom of the City of London in November 2013.

References

Living people
Year of birth missing (living people)
British Army personnel of the Falklands War
British military personnel of The Troubles (Northern Ireland)
Members of the Royal Victorian Order
Officers of the Order of the British Empire
Recipients of the Meritorious Service Medal (United Kingdom)
Military personnel from Cheshire
State ritual and ceremonies
Welsh Guards soldiers
Academics of the Royal Military Academy Sandhurst